Ján Valašťan Dolinský (15 February 1892, Békéscsaba (Békéšská Čaba) – 2 March 1965, Nitra) was a Slovak composer, teacher, journalist, esperantist and collector of folk songs.

He graduated from a teacher's institute and then worked as a teacher. From 1928 he was a teacher in Martin, where he simultaneously worked in the Music department of Matica slovenská.

Works

Folk song collections
 Čabianske ľudové piesne pre mužský zbor (1923)
 Z našich hôr a dolín (1941)

Music for poems
He wrote music for poems of many well-known Slovak poets and it appeared under the name Vám všetkým (1922) and under other names

Song books
 Môj spevník
 Slávme slávne...

Textbooks
 Všeobecná náuka o hudbe (General Music Science)

Esperanto texts
 Mluvnica a slovník slovensko-esperantský (1936; Slovak-Esperanto Grammar and Dictionary; the first Slovak Esperanto textbook)
 Malý esperantsko slovenský slovník (1948; Small Esperanto-Slovak Dictionary)
 Učebnica jazyka esperanto (1949; Textbook of Esperanto)

Works in Esperanto
His original songs include:
 En aŭtuno
 Rememoro
 Profunda okulparo
Translations:
 Je la foiro en Detva by Timrava (Božena Slančíková)
 Adam Ŝangala  by Ladislav Nádaši-Jégé
 translations of works by Pavol Országh Hviezdoslav

1892 births
1965 deaths
People from Békéscsaba
Slovak composers
Male composers
Linguists from Slovakia
Writers of Esperanto literature
Slovak Esperantists
20th-century composers
20th-century linguists
Slovak schoolteachers
Slovak male musicians